Nicholas Clark is a fictional character in the first four seasons of the television series Fear the Walking Dead. He is portrayed by Frank Dillane. Nick is the son of Madison Clark, the series' main protagonist throughout the first four seasons. Nick is a young adult who suffers from an addiction to heroin.

Character biography
Nick, a heroin-addict, is intelligent, quick thinking, and perceptive, he also suffers from an addictive personality. He is the first member of the group to realize the infected are dead.

Season 1

Nick awakens in a church after consuming heroin, to find his girlfriend eating a corpse. He runs away and is hit by a car and hospitalized. The doctor tells Madison and Travis that Nick's claims about the incident are hallucinations, but Travis comes to believe Nick after visiting the church himself. Alicia becomes more worried about Nick's addiction. The next day, school closes early due to high levels of absenteeism and rumors of an epidemic. Nick escapes from the hospital and asks Calvin about the drug's side effects. Calvin tries to kill Nick to prevent him from exposing him and is mortally shot. After Travis and Madison arrive, the zombified Calvin attacks them. Nick runs over him repeatedly with a truck, but the mutilated Calvin is still able to move. The Clark family chooses to flee to the desert. The group returns to Madison's home to gather supplies. Nick suffers from heroin withdrawal, so Madison drives to her school to get him oxycodone. Travis tells Madison to take the kids to the desert. The Manawas and the Salazars later join up with the Clarks. All three families decide to stay there for the night.

The next morning, the California National Guard arrives and quarantines the block. Days after the National Guard arrive, residents try to live normally. Tensions build under military rule. Nick steals morphine from Hector via an IV drip. Soldiers take Griselda and Nick to a hospital. Liza agrees to go to assist the medical team. In a military cell, Strand bribes a guardsman to save Nick from being moved and later recruits Nick for an escape plot. The group drives to the National Guard's headquarters to rescue Liza, Griselda, and Nick. The group infiltrates the base after Daniel distracts the guards by leading a large group of walkers from the arena. Meanwhile, the walkers breach the perimeter and swarm the base. Travis reaches the holding cells and sets the detainees free before reuniting with Nick. Strand leads the group to his mansion, where he reveals to Nick that he owns a yacht which he plans to escape on, called the Abigail.

Season 2

The group evacuates to the Abigail as the military bombs Los Angeles in an attempt to contain the outbreak. The group comes across a boat containing survivors on the ocean, but Strand refuses to pick them up, Nick goes back to shore on the zodiac and brings back Madison, Travis, Chris, and the corpse of Liza to the Abigail. The following morning, Strand informs the group they are heading to San Diego. The group docks on Catrina Island to escape the pursuit of the unknown ship. Daniel and Ofelia stay behind on the boat to keep an eye on Strand, while Travis and the others enter a house on the shore, which is inhabited by a family. They are greeted by the Geary family, and Nick bonds with the children, Harry and Willa. As Harry introduces Nick to his various toys, he is made aware of "power pills" which are heavily implied to be poison. Concerned for the children's safety, Nick goes into the house to investigate and discovers the "power pills" to indeed be poison. Nick goes to Madison and Travis, who agree to take the children after their mother begs Madison. After the discussion however, Willa consumes a pill. She dies and reanimates, and kills her mother. Nick, Madison, Travis, Alicia, and Harry head aboard the Abigail much to Strand's protest. Harry's older brother, Seth, forcefully gets Harry back, and takes him back to the island where he kills his reanimated mother as a disturbed Nick watches as the Abigail leaves.

After an infected is trapped in the Abigail, Nick, Alicia, Chris, and Daniel head ashore on the zodiac to get supplies from the crashed Flight 462 plane. While everyone is looking for supplies, Nick finds a knife and some amoxicillin for Ofelia's injury. Later, as Daniel, Alicia, Chris, and a survivor of the plane crash, Alex, fight a group of infected, Nick arrives covered in infected blood and saves Alicia, giving the group a chance to escape. After the incident, Nick goes to the zodiac with the rest so they can head back to the Abigail. Later that night Nick goes to an abandoned refugee camp where he guts an infected and smears its blood all over his face and body. The following day Nick heads to a gated community with spray paint marks similar to El Sereno's marks where the infected ignored him due to his camouflage. He then makes his way to a house where he is held at gunpoint by Luis Flores until he explains Strand sent him. As Luis loads several objects into his car, Luis explains that the gated community was an Abigail Home Experience and that he'll be the one to get them across the border, however, is taken aback when Nick indirectly mentions his family.

After Nick has washed off the blood and has new clothes, Luis drives to the beach and tells Nick how long he's known Strand and that they're meeting his mother in Baja California. They head to the Abigail, but Nick notices two unknown armed people who are killed by Luis. Once they're on board Nick is told that his sister and Travis were held captive by pirates. Nick helped at all times the plan to exchange them for a person who turned out to be the brother of the bandit leader. Nick became concerned about Chris's condition by keeping an eye on him, so he asked him not to blame himself for not shooting at them before they got on the yacht, arguing that no one would shoot a pregnant woman. With Connor's radio call to carry out the exchange, Nick offered to take Reed and get Alicia and Travis back, but with Chris's murder of the bandit, he seemed to end this idea. Reed the pirate is revived and Daniel devised a way to make him look alive by hooded him. Nick was prevented by his mother from carrying out the mission and watched with Strand in the distance as everything went according to plan. Nick sympathized with Celia Flores, to whom he took his son Luis Flores who had already died in a shooting and was zombified, Nick quickly and confessed to Celia how he was fed up with so much death, but she made him know another point of view in which the dead were a new way of life rather than the end of one. At night, Nick agreed to accompany Ofelia to pray for the well-being of her father and soon after she lost herself in her thoughts remembering when it all began.

When Celia's mansion was charred, Nick decides to leave alone by separating himself from Alicia and Madison. Nick wanders off on his own towards Tijuana. He is attacked by bandits in the wilderness. He is attacked a third time that night by a dog while sleeping. However, a pack of walkers arrives and devours the dog. The walkers are then drawn away by the sounds of car horns and Nick escapes. He then blends in with the walker pack as it makes its way to Tijuana. The previous group of bandits then arrives and kills some walkers but most of them are eaten. Nick eventually passes out due to his wound and malnourishment. A group of survivors observe Nick but they do not help him. Nick has several flashbacks to his time with his girlfriend in rehab for their drug addictions. It is there where he expresses his frustration at his father's lack of attention to him. He is later visited by Madison and learns that his father died in a car crash. Nick wakes to find his girlfriend. Nick then regains consciousness and manages to limp his way to Tijuana. He encounters Luciana's group. Nick begins to observe Luciana's community and is shocked to see Luciana's people banish an infected man. Luciana explains that those who are infected or terminally ill sacrifice themselves to help build a Wall around the community. Nick then accompanies Luciana on a supply run to a nearby supermarket. Nick is caught trying to shoplift. Luciana scolds Nick for his recklessness. Nick is then brought before the community's leader, Alejandro.

In order to preserve their dwindling medicine supplies, Nick proposes to Alejandro that they trick the bandits they promised to trade medicine to by secretly diluting it with powdered milk, protecting their own supply. Alejandro is impressed with Nick's ingenuity and accepts him fully into his community by giving him his own house. He also confirms to Nick that he had been bitten by a walker and somehow did not turn. However, one of the community's scouts returns and reports that Luciana's brother Pablo has been killed. Luciana is shocked at the news and is comforted by Nick. Later that night, Luciana visits Nick, and they both begin to kiss. Nick and Luciana are awoken by the news that one of the community's scouts, Francisco, has deserted with his family. With the community losing scouts at an increasing rate, Alejandro is worried the community might collapse, and forbids anybody from leaving, even for supply runs. Nick is concerned since they were supposed to trade their medicine to the bandits, who will most likely attack the community if they don't get what they want. At the bandit warehouse, Madison and Elena arrive to trade, where she overhears the bandits interrogating Francisco. Madison overhears them describe Nick's appearance and tries to find out where he is with no success. Nick patrols the perimeter and spots the bandits scouting the community from a distance. Upon returning to the hotel, Madison turns on the hotel lights against everybody's wishes in hopes of attracting Nick's attention, though Alicia convinces her to respect Nick's decision to choose death over their family, despite becoming upset about Madison not appearing to care about her decision to stick with the group. Madison shuts off the lights, but not before Travis, now alone, sees them.

Nick attempts to convince the bandits not to attack the community, but their leader, Marco, explains to him that he knows how they get in and out of the Colonia, using the walkers as their army, and leaves him with an ultimatum: abandon the community or he and his men will slaughter everybody. To demonstrate his resolve, Marco shows Nick the executed corpses of Francisco and his family. Nick then returns and warns Luciana about the impending attack and asks her to leave with him. However, Luciana is still adamant about Alejandro's ability to protect them. Frustrated, Nick forces Alejandro to admit that he's not actually immune to the infection and that he had been using his medical experience to merely suppress the symptoms. Nick quietly leaves the community and notices a helicopter landing at a town on the American side of the border. He returns to the community to convince Alejandro to evacuate the community. The next day, when Marco and his bandits arrive, they find the community seemingly abandoned. However, unknown to them, a terminally ill Alejandro breaks open the community's improvised gate, allowing the infected to enter and forcing Marco and his men to flee. Nick and Luciana lead their group out of the colony and towards the border.

Season 3

Travis finds himself with Nick, an injured Luciana and other captives. The captives are shot to see how long it takes for them to turn. Travis, Luciana, and Nick attempt to escape,  Nick finds a horde of walkers at the end of the sewer and makes his way back. The family is reunited but the compound is overrun with walkers, forcing everyone to leave. Travis, Luciana, and Alicia escape aboard a helicopter while Madison and Nick leave in a truck with Troy. Nick arrives at the Broke Jaw Ranch, where Troy tries to kill Luciana, but he is opposed to eliminating her, after which Nick forces the others to help Luciana. A recovering Luciana informs Nick that they must leave the ranch as soon as possible. Back in her cabin, Madison discovers Troy laying in Nick's bed, and he expresses contempt for her son; Madison tells Troy that Nick will learn to fit in. While boar hunting, Nick discovers he and Troy have similar worldviews. The team investigating the helicopter shooting is overdue; Troy is to lead a second team and Madison volunteers to accompany them.  However, Nick and Jeremiah bond by cleaning up the wreck, locating Jeremiah's prized antique revolver. Nick hopes Luciana will like the house but she leaves in the night. Later Nick and Jeremiah find Gretchen and her family murdered and turned; they all realize Troy was responsible but Madison informs the community that Walker did it to prepare them for the upcoming conflict. A crippling illness suddenly strikes the community and many of the militia die and reanimate as walkers, massacring the residents; Nick sees Ofelia running and realizes she was responsible before he also falls sick, discovering that Ofelia made coffee with Anthrax powder. Nick digs under the old cabin and learns Jeremiah and the founders killed three braves who were attacking their cattle, plus Walker's father. When Madison urges Jeremiah to kill himself, saying this will appease Walker and preserve Jeremiah's legacy; Nick kills him instead and they stage it as a suicide.

Nick was on an expedition with the militia when he observed the arrival of Walker and his people to the community to settle there. Later he toasted with the rest for the union of both groups and a better future. Unfortunately, these ideals did not last long when one of the ranchers fired on the natives and this led all the natives to decide to arm themselves for protection. With the mission of stripping all the weapons that the residents of the ranch possessed, Nick along with Walker, Madison visited Troy's house to search for any weapons he possessed, but the mission turned into a war field when the deranged man attacked the natives shot. Accompanying his friend in an attempt to calm him down, Nick finally had no choice but to reveal that his father had not committed suicide, but that he had killed him. Nick becomes Troy's successor in the militia, and he cautions them to bide their time. When the natives try to take possession of the main well but Nick, armed with the ranchers' last pistol, leads a sit-in. There is a run for water, draining the aquifer. The militia move on the native guards but at the last moment is inspired by efforts to tap a new well. When Troy visits Nick in the night, this his warns him that the ranch will be destroyed. However Nick and Jake set out to find Troy and discover him using the grenade launcher to guide a herd of walking dead toward the ranch. Troy explains that the herd will force the people into the desert, as he was, and only the fittest will survive. Jake holds Troy at gunpoint but hesitates on learning that Nick killed their father and Alicia kept it secret. When the infected herd invades the ranch provoked by Troy, Nick and Troy drive through the herd and become trapped in the helicopter. Ofelia and Crazy Dog ignite the ranch's fuel depot. Madison, Strand, and Walker return and rescue Nick, Troy, and Alicia. After leaving the ranch that was overrun with the infected, Madison and Nick take care of Ofelia who reveals that she was bitten during her stay in the pantry. Nick goes on a binge of drugs and drinking, wrangling Troy into joining him, eventually wading through a group of walking dead when Nick confesses that he can't go with Madison. The next morning, Daniel agrees to let Madison's group come to the dam but Nick and Troy decide to stay at the bazaar. Nick is warned by Troy, that the proctors want to attack the dam, while Strand tells Nick to get his family out, having made a deal with the Proctors but no longer being able to guarantee anyone's safety. Nick is then questioned by Daniel about the herd, giving Nick another reason to get them out. However, when Madison learns that Troy led the herd she murders him in front of Nick. Strand opens a gate for the Proctors. As the Proctors overrun the dam, Strand takes the detonator and hides Madison and Nick. Beginning a fierce discussion with his mother, in which the boy recriminated his actions of killing everything that stood in his way, Madison clarified that he would never be able to put his life before his son's, despite his opinion otherwise. Holding Strand at gunpoint, Strand informed them that Alicia was at the facility, so they reluctantly agreed to Strand's plan to escape the prey safely. However, the operation was frustrated with the appearance of Lola, who in revenge for the death of all her people faced the supervisors until she was killed by John. Reuniting with his sister and being convicted along with his family and Victor for nearly ruining the supervisors' plans, Nick removed the detonator from Victor's pocket while hugging him and ordered his family to escape while he sacrificed himself. Despite receiving tactical support from a distance from Walker and Lee with their sniper, Nick was forced to detonate the bombs ahead of time and as a result, he could only watch as the raft his family was on ended up being dragged by the stream.

Season 4

Two years after the explosion of the Gonzalez Dam, Nick, Alicia, and Strand are reunited with Luciana. At the end of the episode, Althea, Morgan Jones, and John Dorie are ambushed by the four. A year before, the group was a part of a community living in a baseball stadium. Madison and others, excluding Nick, set out to find Charlie's family, a young girl in the community. Madison's group reaches a deserted town and they split up to search. Madison and Alicia find a burned down camp near giant oil tanks, which has a white flag with the number "457". Madison comes across a woman named Naomi and Madison invites her to their community. At night, a large convoy of trucks approaches the stadium. Mel, the leader of a group known as the Vultures, rounds up walkers outside the stadium and into a truck; it is then labeled, "12". Madison goes out to talk with Mel, and he tells Madison he knows of their weevil problem, thanks to Charlie who is revealed as a spy. Mel orders Madison to give them all their supplies or they will die from their lack of resources. Madison refuses and walks away. Catching up to the events of the previous episode: Luciana finds a flag marked "51" in Althea's SWAT truck, and Alicia orders them to take them to where they found the flag. In flashbacks, Nick and Madison go on a supply run, however, when arrive, they discover that Mel's brother Ennis has already looted it. Charlie eavesdropped on Madison and obtained the location, giving it to Ennis. Nick pleads with Charlie to not listen to the Vultures. Nick then attacks Ennis with his knife, but Madison stops him from killing Ennis. Charlie goes with Ennis in his blue El Camino and they drove off.

In the present, the SWAT vehicle swerves off the road and crashes after a commotion inside the vehicle between the two groups. Nick spots the blue El Camino and chases after it. The others find a service station that has a truck with a wire cable, that they can use to tow the SWAT vehicle from the mud. Returning to the SWAT truck, they fight off various infected and successfully tow it. Nick finds Ennis at a farm and they fight inside a silo. Nick impales Ennis on a deer antler display, killing him. Nick is then shot by Charlie. The rest of the group arrives, where they try to revive him, but he dies. Alicia sobs and is left devastated.

Development and reception

Dillane has received positive reviews for his portrayal of Nick Clark. Episode three (of season four) features the death of his character. In an interview after the episode had aired, Dillane revealed he asked to leave the show prior to the fourth season. The actor explained:

References

Characters created by Robert Kirkman
Fear the Walking Dead
Fictional characters from California
Television characters introduced in 2015
Fictional heroin users
The Walking Dead (franchise) characters